WBCH may refer to:

 WBCH (AM), a radio station (1220 AM) licensed to Hastings, Michigan, United States
 WBCH-FM, a radio station (100.1 FM) licensed to Hastings, Michigan, United States